Li Gyong-ae (born 25 August 1976) is a North Korean cross-country skier  who competed in the women's 5 km race at the 1992 Winter Olympics in Albertville, France. She placed 61st overall, finishing the race with a time of 18:54.1. This would be her only Olympic appearance.

References

External links

1976 births
Olympic cross-country skiers of North Korea
Cross-country skiers at the 1992 Winter Olympics
North Korean female cross-country skiers
Living people